Jean Gaulmier (10 March 1905, Charenton-du-Cher11 November 1997, Paris) was a French orientalist who befriended Zaki al-Arsuzi, one of the principal founders of Ba'athism.

1905 births
1997 deaths
20th-century French writers
École Normale Supérieure alumni
French orientalists
French publishers (people)
Academic staff of the University of Paris
Academic staff of the University of Strasbourg
Academic staff of Saint Joseph University
20th-century French male writers
French male non-fiction writers